This is a list of the national symbols of Cuba.

National symbols

References

 
Cuban culture